The Laxminarayan Dev Gadi (Gujarati:- લક્ષ્મીનારાયણ દેવ ગાદી) is one of the two gadis (diocese) that together form the Swaminarayan Sampraday. It is headquartered at the Shri Swaminarayan Mandir, Vadtal and controls the Dakshin Vibhag Lekh.

There is currently an active court case regarding the Vadtal Gadi. Gujarat High court has stayed the order removing Ajendraprsadji Maharaj until a final verdict is reached. He cannot enjoy the right of acharya during the proceedings. The dev paksh faction has appointed Rakeshprasad  as their acharya in  the Gadi.

Siddhant paksh maintains that Ajendraprasad Pande is the current Acharya of the Vadtal Gadi and welcome his son, Nrigendraprasad Pande, to officiate at functions in Swaminarayan temples in his absence.

History
In Vadtal, on Prabodhini Ekadashi of Vikram Samvat 1882, Swaminarayan adopted his nephews Ayodhyaprasadji Pande (Son of elder brother Rampratapji) and Raghuveerji Pande (Son of younger brother Ichcharamji) as his sons. Establishing the two Gadis i.e. Nar Narayan Dev Gadi, headquartered at Ahmedabad and Laxminarayan Dev Gadi, headquartered at Vadtal, Swaminarayan instructed the two cousins to draw lots, to decide who would be seated on which Gadi. Swaminarayan handed over the responsibility of Satsang and both acharyas to Gopalanand Swami by instructing Gopalanand Swami to make each and every satsangi including sadhus, Brahmachari and haribhakt to remain under the commands of the Acharyas.

Ayodhyaprasadji Maharaj was appointed the inaugural Acharya of the Nar Narayan Dev Gadi (also known as the Uttar Vibhag - Northern division), whilst Raghuveerji Maharaj became the inaugural Acharya of the LaxmiNarayan Dev Gadi (also known as the Dakshin Vibhag - Southern division).

The administrative division between the two is set forth in minute detail in a document written by Swaminarayan, called Desh Vibhag Lekh. The method by which future Acharyas are to be appointed is enshrined in the document Desh Vibhag Lekh.

Swaminarayan then instructed all the followers present to do pooja of their respective acharyas.

Organizational structure 

In 1826 at Vadtal, Swaminarayan established the dual Acharyaship in Dharmavanshi Acharyas, whom he intended as his successor. "Dharmavanshi" means "belonging to the lineage of Dharmadev" – the father of Swaminarayan. Swaminarayan enthroned his two adopted sons, Ayodhyaprasad Pande and Raghuvir Pande, who were the sons of his brothers Rampratapji and Ichcharamji, as the spiritual leaders of the Nar Narayan Dev Gadi headquartered at Ahmedabad and the Laxmi Narayan Dev Gadi headquartered at Vadtal respectively. He installed them as the Acharyas for all followers, including householders and ascetics. Swaminarayan gave sole authority to these two individuals to install murtis in temples and to initiate sadhus and householders into the Sampraday. He did this using a legal document known as "Desh Vibhag no Lekh", which he dictated and was written by Shukanand Swami. Learned saints and elder satsangis witnessed this document. Copies were presented to the inaugural Acharyas, Ayodhyaprasad Pande and Raghuvir Pande – these are currently in the possession of the current Acharyas. The document was accepted by the Bombay High Court as the authoritative document regarding the apportionment of the two dioceses, so it has legal standing. Presently, Acharya Maharajshri Ajendraprasadji Maharaj is at the head of Laxmi Narayan Dev Gadi, while Acharya Maharajshri Koshalendraprasadji Maharaj is at the head of the Nar Narayan Dev Gadi at Ahmedabad.

Importance of Acharyas 
Swaminarayan thought that as he had established the temples and the Swaminarayan Sampraday, he wanted to keep his sadhus free from the affairs dealing with wealth, power and other worldly affairs. He decided to create leaders who would subsequently be responsible for the Swaminarayan Sampraday. This led to his decision to appoint his nephews as Acharyas. The constitution of the Sampraday is laid out in Desh Vibhag Lekh which describes in detail the functions of the Acharyas.... it is my command to all sadhus, bhamcharis and all satsangies, that for the purpose of your kalyaan (emancipation) you must obey and follow the two Acharyas of Dharmavansh, and obey their commands by thought, action and speech. If this is compromised and whoever turns elsewhere (rejecting the Acharyas) will find that they will never find sukh (happiness) in this world or the worlds beyond and will experience immense distress ... ― Desh Vibhag LekhThe Acharyas of the Sampraday are administrative heads, spiritual leaders and the gurus of their followers. Since the acharyas are supposed to refrain from contact with the opposite sex, except close relations, the acharyas' wives are the gurus for female members of the sect, and must avoid contact with unfamiliar men. The acharyas wear a red turban, and carry a golden staff and umbrella, the symbols of their authority In the scripture Purushottam Prakash (Nishkulanand Kavya), the writer Nishkulanand Swami describes Swaminarayan's establishment of the Dharmavanshi Acharyas.

The Acharyas are responsible for:

 Initiating followers into the organization with a Samanya Diksha by giving the guru-mantra
 Initiating monks-sadhus by giving them the Maha-Bhagwadi Diksha
 Perform murti-pratishtha, installing deities in the temples
 Authenticating scriptures of the Sampraday
 Acting as the Guru and leader of the entire Sampraday

These responsibilities are prescribed in the holy texts Shikshapatri, Satsangi Jeevan and Desh Vibhag Lekh, according to which no person other than the Dharmavanshi Acharyas may carry out these duties.

In one of the most authoritative scriptures, the Vachanamrut, Swaminarayan states one of the prerequisites for attaining Akshardham. He wrote, "The devotee who is aashrit of Dharmakul (i.e. he who has received initiation from Dharmavanshi Acharya and remains loyal to the Acharya) gets a divine Bhram-state body by God's wish." It is seen as imperative to be a humble, loyal follower of the Dharmavanshi Acharya once receiving the diksha (guru mantra) in order to achieve a bhram form. In Swamini Vato, Swaminarayan was quoted, "Even Gunatitanand Swami, one of the main sadhus of Swaminarayan states, 'He who insults the temples, Acharyas, sadhus and satsangis will find his roots being destroyed and will inevitably fall from the satsang.'"

Membership 
Male satsangis are initiated by the acharya of the gadi he comes under. Female satsangis are initiated by the wife of the acharya, who is the leader of women in the Swaminarayan Sampraday. In the absence of the acharya, ascetics perform this initiation, which is then confirmed by the acharya on his next visit. The ceremony involves the taking of five vows (panch vartaman): not to commit adultery or robbery, not to consume intoxicants or meat and not to lie. The initiator then pours water over the initiates hands, gives him a Sanskrit shloka, Shri Krishna twam gatirmama, meaning Shri Krishna thou art my refuge. The initiate then offers at least half a rupee to the acharya, who adorns a kanthi thread around the initiate's neck. The initiate is then required to apply the tilak chandlo to his forehead (chandan U and red kum kum dot in the middle). Ladies only apply the red kum kum dot.

There are eight important things in the life of a Satsangi; these are Kanthi – a thread worn around the neck, the Tilak Chandlo – a holy mark, the Mala – a thread with 108 beads, Nitya Pooja – daily prayers, the Temple, Darshan – a form of worship, Aarti – a ceremony, and Vandu Pad and Chesta Pad – verses recited in the temples daily. A Satsangi must show reverence for God, the Shastras, the Acharya of the Gadi the Satsangi comes under (NarNarayan Dev Gadi or LaxmiNarayan Dev Gadi), festivals, elders and be of overall good conduct.

Upon initiation, Satsangi make 11 vows, called Niyams (Rules):

 Be non-violent
 Do not have any kind of relationship with a woman other than your wife
 Do not eat meat, including seafood, poultry products or eggs
 Do not drink products that contain alcohol, including medicines
 Never touch a widow woman whom you do not know
 Never commit suicide in any circumstances
 Do not steal
 Never blame others for something that you may not know about
 Never disparage God, Goddesses, or any religion
 Never eat someone's food who does not follow these eleven rules
 Never listen to holy stories from an atheist.

Ascetics 
From the beginning, ascetics have played a major role in the Swaminarayan Sampraday. They contribute towards growth and development of the movement and towards the salvation of its members. Sadhus, initiated by either Dharmavanshi Acharya, also form an integral part of the organization and wear only orange robes. The Brahmachari ascetics, who are Brahmins, have a special responsibility of taking care of images in temples. These ascetics wear white robes on their waist and an orange cloth over their shoulder. Ascetics lead a strict life, refraining from worldly pleasures and devoting their lives to the service of the holy fellowship. They preach the philosophy and lifetimes of Swaminarayan and encourage people to follow a pious and religious life. Swaminarayan has stated in the Vachanamrut that the association of Satpurush (true saints/devotees) opens the path to salvation. In 1999, the Ahmedabad Gadi had 765 male ascetics and the Vadtal Gadi 1468 male ascetics.

The first rule of becoming an ascetic (sanyasi) of the sect is never to come in contact with the opposite sex, or money. Ascetics are not allowed to leave the temple alone; they have to move out in pairs. Even in the temple, while using the toilet, they must do so in pairs to ensure they keep their vows. The food they eat must be mixed up so that they may not taste it.

Female ascetics, known as Samkhya yoginis, receive initiation from the Gadiwala, or wife of the Acharya. They stay within the temple, follow ascetic rules strictly, wear dark red clothing and stay in the temple Haveli. They take care of the images in women's temples and conduct discourses for women. In 1999, the Ahmedabad Gadi had 440 female ascetics and the Vadtal Gadi had 115 female ascetics.

The Government of India intervened by setting up an arbitration panel in June 2001. A settlement was brokered by a panel between the two factions in June 2002, but the Dev faction led by Nautam Swami (Mahant of the Vadtal temple) refused to cooperate, leading to an intensification of the dispute. A number of sadhus of this faction were subsequently exposed in a sex scandal only three months after another five sadhus were sentenced to death for murdering their guru in the Vadtal branch.

Organizations within Laxmi Narayan Dev Gadi 
 International Swaminarayan Satsang Mandal 
 Shree Swaminarayan Agyna Upasana Satsang Mandal 
-The Shree Swaminarayan Agyna Upasana Satsang Mandal (SSAUSM) is an original organization based in United States that comes under the Laxminarayan Dev Gadi, Vadtal. It has several temples in the US, all of which are named Vadtal Dham after the parent organization. The very first Vadtal Mandir in USA falls under SSAUSM leadership. The Swaminarayan Mandir in Wheeling, IL was established by Acharya Ajendraprasadji Maharaj.
  Shree Swaminarayan Gurukul Rajkot Sansthan
 Shree Swaminarayan Mandir Kundaldham Sansthan (SMK)
 Sardhar Sansthan
 Hanuman temple, Salangpur

Acharyas
The following table lists all the Acharyas till date.

The next Acharya of the Vadtal Gadi is Bhavi Acharya Shree Nrugendra Prasadji Maharaj. The Supreme Court has recognized his status as the next Acharya of Vadtal and granted use of designation Bhavi (future) Acharya. He performs duties on behalf of Ajendraprasad. The case around the current head of the branch is currently in legal litigation.

Charitable Activities 
SVG Charity, a subsidiary of the Vadtal diocese gadi, is involved in disaster relief, food, medicine, and blood donations across its chapters in the United States, Europe, Canada, and India.

In 2013, under the guidance of Vadtal Acharya Ajendraprasadji Maharaj, Laxmi Narayan Dev Yuvak Mandal was honored by the Golden Book of World Records for registering 21,900 Eye Donations in one hour in an organ donation charity drive. Surpassing the previous record of 6350 held by the AP Foundation. Also in 2013, Laxminarayan Dev Yuvak Mandal recorded the world record for most body donations to medical sciences and studies with 352 registrants in a 12-hour window, surpassing the previous world record of 173 but OCD International.

The Vadtal Dham Swaminarayan Hindu Temple in Monmouth Junction, New Jersey distributed free PPE kits during the COVID-19 lockdown to provide access to masks and sanitizer within its local community. They also conducted food drives for local Food Pantries.

Vadtal Dham Shree Swaminarayan Hindu Temple Houston, in conjunction with other regional Hindu organizations and Sewa International, helped distribute 16,500 pounds of food during the COVID-19 crisis along with PPE kits with drive-through events to help communities in need.

See also
 Swaminarayan
 Swaminarayan Sampraday

References

Sources
 

Swaminarayan Sampradaya